Teachout is a surname. Notable people with the surname include:

 Bud Teachout (1904–1985), pitcher in Major League Baseball
 Terry Teachout (1956-2022), American critic, biographer, librettist, author, playwright, and blogger
 Zephyr Teachout (born 1971), American academic and political activist

See also
 Teachout Building, Des Moines, Iowa, United States
 Teach-out, an arrangement for allowing students to complete their course of study when a school closes down